Achelia alaskensis is a species of sea spider within the family Ammotheidae. The species is found distributed off the western side of North America in the Pacific and Arctic Ocean, areas such as Canada, Alaska, Oregon, Washington, and California, as well as in the Bering Sea. It lives in benthic environments at depths up to 180 meters. It grows to a length of 1 centimeter. Larvae of the species are parasites and are found in Polyorchis karafutoensis.

References 

Pycnogonids
Animals described in 1904
Fauna of the Pacific Ocean
Western North American coastal fauna